Nagam Janardhan Reddy (born May 22, 1948) is an Indian politician. Reddy is a five term member of the Andhra Pradesh Legislative Assembly, representing the Nagarkurnool constituency.

Political career
Nagam Janardhan Reddy started his political career with Telugu Desam Party. He served as a  Member of Legislative Assembly from Nagarkurnool. He was the Minister of Health  in the state of United Andhra Pradesh from the year 1995 to 2004. 

In the year 2011 he was suspended from the Telugu Desam Party for anti party activities. He later immediately quit from the assembly in support of creation of a separate Telangana state.
Later he floated a new political party 'Telangana Nagara Samithi' merged with Bharatiya Janata Party. In 2012 he again contested from the same constituency as an Independent candidate and was successful.

In 2013 Reddy joined the Bharatiya Janata Party.  

In the year 2018 after quitting Bharatiya Janata Party he joined the Indian National Congress Congress party.

References

Telugu politicians
People from Telangana
Telangana politicians
Bharatiya Janata Party politicians from Telangana
1949 births
Living people
Indian National Congress politicians
Telugu Desam Party politicians